Tanev is a Bulgarian surname. Notable people with the surname include:

Anton Yugov (Anton Tanev Yugov), Bulgarian politician 
Badr Salem Nayef (born Petar Tanev), Qatari weightlifter
Brandon Tanev, Canadian ice hockey player
Christopher Tanev, Canadian ice hockey player
Ivan Tanev, Bulgarian former hammer thrower
Lachezar Tanev, Bulgarian former footballer
Milcho Tanev, Bulgarian footballer
Milen Tanev, Bulgarian footballer
Peter Tanev, Danish/Bulgarian weather presenter
Vasil Tanev, Bulgarian tried for complicity in the Reichstag fire in 1933. 

Bulgarian-language surnames